Cordillacris occipitalis, known generally as the spot-winged grasshopper or spotted wing grasshopper, is a species of slant-faced grasshopper in the family Acrididae. It is found in North America.

References

Further reading

 

Acrididae
Articles created by Qbugbot
Insects described in 1873